Nick Jooste (born 7 July 1997) is an Australian Rugby Union player who currently plays for the Melbourne Rebels in Super Rugby pacific. His regular playing position is fly-half.

Rugby career
Jooste turned out for both Australian Schools Barbarians and Australia Schoolboys in 2015 and later in the year became just the sixth Australian player to earn a Super Rugby contract whilst still in high school. The others were Kurtley Beale, Quade Cooper, James O'Connor, Luke Jones and Chris Feauai-Sautia.

Super Rugby statistics

References

1997 births
Living people
Australian rugby union players
Rugby union fly-halves
Rugby union centres
Rugby union fullbacks
Perth Spirit players
Sportsmen from Western Australia
People educated at Hale School
Canberra Vikings players
ACT Brumbies players
Kamaishi Seawaves players
Western Force players
Melbourne Rebels players
Rugby union players from Perth, Western Australia